Hyproc Shipping Company (Arabic: هيبروك للنقل البحري) is the company specialized in maritime transport of hydrocarbons. Founded in 1982 by government decree, it is located in Oran in Algeria. In 1997, it became a subsidiary of Sonatrach.

It ranks 2nd in the world for LPG exporters after Russia and 7th in the world for LNG exporters after Qatar, Malaysia, Australia, Nigeria, Indonesia and Trinidad and Tobago.

History
Hyproc Shipping Company, was formerly an economic public company named Société Nationale de Transport Maritime des Hydrocarbures et des Produits Chimiques (SNTM-HYPROC) was born in 1982, following decree n° 82-282 of August 14, 1982.

The Company became a joint-stock company (SPA), after transformation of its statutes in 1995.

In October 1997, SNTM-HYPROC became a 100% subsidiary of the Sonatrach group, under the supervision of the holding company Société d’Investissement et de Participation (SIP).

The Company changed portfolio in December 2001 and joined the holding company Société de Valorisation des Hydrocarbures (SVH) of Sonatrach.

In 2003, SNTM-HYPROC became "Hyproc Shipping Company", after modifying its statutes.

References

External links

Official website

Oil and gas companies of Algeria
Transport in Algeria
Maritime transport
Companies based in Oran
Energy companies established in 1982
1982 establishments in Algeria